Dwaram or Dvaram (Telugu: ద్వారం) means doorway in Telugu language.

Dwaram is also one of the Indian surnames.
 Dwaram Venkataswamy Naidu was one of the most important carnatic violinists of the 20th century.
 Dwaram Bhavanarayana Rao, an eminent musician and writer.
 Dwaram Lakshmi, an Indian singer

Indian surnames